The men's 5,000 metres at the 2012 IPC Athletics European Championships was held at Stadskanaal Stadium from 24–28 July.

Medalists
Results given by IPC Athletics.

Results

T11
Final

T12
Final

T54
Final

See also
List of IPC world records in athletics

References

5,000 metres
5000 metres at the World Para Athletics European Championships